Boreothrinax is a genus of flies in the family Pyrgotidae.

Species 
B. debilis (Osten Sacken, 1877)
B. dichaetus Steyskal, 1978
B. filiola (Loew, 1876)
B. maculipennis (Macquart, 1846)
B. shewelli Steyskal, 1978

References 

Pyrgotidae
Diptera of North America